Masonry dams are dams made out of masonrymainly stone and brick, sometimes joined with mortar. They are either the gravity or the arch-gravity type. The largest masonry dam in the World is Nagarjunasagar Dam , Andhra Pradesh & Telangana, in India.

Visual examples

See also
Causeway
Retaining wall
Dam
Gravity dam
Arch-gravity dam

References

 01
Dams by type
Masonry buildings and structures
Brick buildings and structures
Stone buildings